Megapallifera is a genus of air-breathing land slugs, terrestrial pulmonate gastropod mollusks in the family Philomycidae.

Species

Species within the genus Megapallifera include:

 Megapallifera mutabilis

References

 Nomenclator Zoologicus info

Philomycidae